Fellaoucene is a town and commune in Tlemcen Province in northwestern Algeria.

Notable people
 Abdelkader Bensalah-politician

References

Communes of Tlemcen Province